The Macedonian dynasty (Greek: Μακεδονική Δυναστεία) ruled the Byzantine Empire from 867 to 1056, following the Amorian dynasty. During this period, the Byzantine state reached its greatest extent since the Muslim conquests, and the Macedonian Renaissance in letters and arts began. The dynasty was named after its founder, Basil I the Macedonian who came from the theme of Macedonia, which, at the time, was part of Thrace.

Origins

The dynasty's ethnic origin is unknown, and has been a subject of debate. During Basil's reign, an elaborate genealogy was produced that purported that his ancestors were not mere peasants, as everyone believed, but descendants of the Arsacid (Arshakuni) kings of Armenia, Alexander the Great and also of Constantine the Great. Some Persian writers such as Hamza al-Isfahani or Al-Tabari, called Basil a Saqlabi, an ethnogeographic term that usually denoted the Slavs, but it can be interpreted as a generic term encompassing the inhabitants of the region between Constantinople and Bulgaria.

Thus, claims have been made for the dynasty's founder (Basil I) being of Armenian, Slavonic, or "Armeno-Slavonic" descent from his paternal side. The name of his mother points to a Greek origin on the maternal side.

The author of the only dedicated biography of Basil I in English has concluded that it is impossible to be certain what the ethnic origins of the emperor were, though Basil was definitely reliant on the support of Armenians in prominent positions within the Byzantine Empire.

List of rulers 
Basil I the Macedonian (Βασίλειος Α') (811–886, ruled 867–886) – married Eudokia Ingerina, mistress of Michael III; died in hunting accident
Leo VI the Wise (Λέων Ϛ') (866–912, ruled 886–912) – son of Eudokia Ingerina, legal son and heir of Basil I; possibly the natural son of Michael III; created church crisis with his fourth marriage—Zoe Karbonopsina, who took over as regent for their son, Constantine VII, in 914 and ruled the empire until 919
Alexander (Αλέξανδρος) (870–913, ruled 912–913) – son of Basil I, regent for nephew
Constantine VII the Purple-born (Κωνσταντῖνος Ζ') (905–959, ruled 913–920 and 945-959) – son of Leo VI and Zoe Karbonopsina; married Helena, daughter of Romanos Lekapenos
Romanos I Lekapenos (Ρωμανός A') (c. 870–948, ruled 920–944) – staged a successful coup in 919 and became senior emperor in 920; deposed in 944 and exiled
Romanos II the Purple-born (Ρωμανός Β') (938–963, ruled 959–963) – son of Constantine VII
Nikephoros II Phokas (Νικηφόρος Β' Φωκᾶς) (912–969, ruled 963–969) – successful general, married Romanos II's widow, regent for Basil; assassinated (Origin: Cappadocian)
John I Tzimiskes (Ιωάννης Α')(925-976, ruled 969–976) – successful general, brother-in-law of Romanos II, lover of Nikephoros's wife but banned from marriage, regent for Basil II and Constantine VIII
Basil II (Βασίλειος Β') the Bulgar-slayer (958–1025, ruled 976–1025) – son of Romanos II
Constantine VIII (Κωνσταντῖνος Η') (960-1028, ruled 1025–1028) – son of Romanos II; silent co-emperor with Basil II, sole emperor after his brother's death
Zoe (Ζωή) (c. 978–1050, ruled 1028–1050) – daughter of Constantine VIII
Romanos III Argyros (Ρωμανός Γ') (968–1034, ruled 1028–1034) – eparch of Constantinople; Zoe's first husband, arranged by Constantine VIII; murdered
Michael IV the Paphlagonian (Μιχαήλ Δ') (1010–1041, ruled 1034–1041) – Zoe's second husband
Michael V the Caulker (Μιχαήλ Ε') (1015–1042, ruled 1041–1042) – Michael IV's nephew, Zoe's adopted son
Theodora (Θεοδώρα) (980–1056, ruled 1042) – daughter of Constantine VIII, co-empress with Zoe
Constantine IX Monomachos (Κωνσταντῖνος Θ') (1000–1055, ruled 1042–1055) – Zoe's third husband
Theodora (Θεοδώρα) (ruled 1055–1056) – restored

Non-dynastic
Michael VI (Μιχαήλ Ϛ') (ruled 1056–1057) – chosen by Theodora; deposed and entered monastery

Family tree 

 Basil I the Macedonian (813–886)
 from his marriage to Maria:
 Constantine (865–878), co-emperor with his father
 Anastasia
 from his marriage to empress Eudokia Ingerina:
 Leo VI the Wise (866–912)
 Eudokia (died 892)
 Anna, betrothed and married to Louis the Blind
 Basil (died 900)
 Constantine VII Porphyrogennetos (905–959), married Helena Lekapene, daughter of Romanos I Lekapenos 
 Romanos II (938–963) married to Bertha, daughter of Hugh of Italy king of Italy
 childless by his marriage to Bertha of Italy
 from his marriage to Theophano:
 Basil II the Bulgar-Slayer (957–1025)
 Constantine VIII (961–1028) married Helena, daughter of Alypius
 Eudokia
 Zoe (978–1050), married: 
 Romanos III Argyros (ca. 968–1034)
 Michael IV the Paphlagonian (1015–1042)
 Constantine IX Monomachos (ca. 1000–1055)
 Theodora (980–1056)
 Anna Porphyrogeneta (963–1011), married Vladimir I of Kiev
 Agathe
 Theodora, married John I Tzimiskes
 Stephen I (867–893), Patriarch of Constantinople
 Alexander (870–913)

Genealogy

See also 
 Lekapenos
 Phokas (Byzantine family)
 Byzantine Empire under the Macedonian dynasty

References

Sources